40/40 (originally subtitled The Best Selection) is a two-disc compilation by American pop group The Carpenters. The album features 40 songs that span their entire career (10 of them were determined by Japanese fan voting), and first issued by Universal Japan on April 22, 2009 (forty years after they signed to A&M Records). It was issued worldwide half a year later, leaving out its subtitle.

The cover art was taken from the photo sessions for the album Horizon, showing a healthy and glowing Karen and Richard. A television spot aired for the album, prominently featuring the famous "Carpenters" logo. Included in this set is the original, long version of a UK top-10 hit "Calling Occupants of Interplanetary Craft", and their last top-20 U.S. hit "Touch Me When We're Dancing".

In Japan, 40/40 received a commercial success upon its release. It debuted and peaked at the number-three position on the Japanese Oricon, making them one of the Western artists with the most top-ten albums in the history of that country's chart (following Madonna and The Beatles, tying with Queen, The Rolling Stones and Paul McCartney/Wings). The album also charted in the UK, peaking at #21 in November 2009.

The original Japanese release was pressed on the SHM-CD (super high material CD) with improved sound, while the cheaper international edition was issued on the standard CD format. One other change is that the Japanese track listing included "Leave Yesterday Behind" while the standard worldwide release substituted "Touch Me When We're Dancing".

Critical reception

Track listing

Chart positions

Certification

References

The Carpenters compilation albums
2009 greatest hits albums